Jiang Xinxiong (born July 1931) is a Chinese business executive and politician who served as  from 1983 to 1985 and general manager of the China National Nuclear Corporation from 1988 to 1999.

He was a member of the 12th, 13th and 14th Central Committee of the Chinese Communist Party.

Biography
Jiang was born in the town of Nanxun, Zhejiang, in July 1931. In 1949, he enrolled at Nankai University, majoring in machine manufacturing. 

After graduating in 1952, he was assigned to Jixi Mining Machinery Factory as a technician. He joined the Chinese Communist Party (CCP) in April 1956. Starting in June 1958, he successively served as engineer, section chief, shift director, deputy workshop director, workshop director, deputy director of the Revolutionary Committee, deputy secretary of the Communist Party Committee, factory director, and senior engineer of the Plant 504, China's first enriched uranium production plant in Lanzhou, northwest China's Gansu province. 

In April 1982, he was promoted to become vice minister of atomic energy industry, but having held the position for only one year. In June 1983, he was promoted again to become . In May 1988, he was appointed general manager of the newly founded China National Nuclear Corporation, and held that office for more than ten year. During his term in office, he organized and participated in the construction of both Qinshan Nuclear Power Plant and Daya Bay Nuclear Power Plant. In March 1998, he took office as vice chairperson of the National People's Congress Financial and Economic Affairs Committee.

References

1931 births
Living people
People from Huzhou
Nankai University alumni
People's Republic of China politicians from Zhejiang
Chinese Communist Party politicians from Zhejiang
Members of the 12th Central Committee of the Chinese Communist Party
Members of the 13th Central Committee of the Chinese Communist Party
Members of the 14th Central Committee of the Chinese Communist Party